Āryāvarta (Sanskrit: आर्यावर्त, lit. "Land of the Aryans") is a term for the northern Indian subcontinent along with some other parts in the ancient Hindu texts such as Dharmashastras and Sutras, referring to the area of the Indian subcontinent settled by Indo-Aryan tribes and where Indo-Aryan religion and rituals predominated. The limits of Āryāvarta extended over time, as reflected in the various sources, as the influence of the Brahmanical ideology spread eastwards in post-Vedic times.

Geographical boundaries

Ganges-Yamuna doab

The Baudhayana Dharmasutra (BDS) 1.1.2.10 (perhaps compiled in the 8th to 6th centuries BCE) declares that Āryāvarta is the land that lies west of Kālakavana, east of Adarsana, south of the Himalayas and north of the Vindhyas, but in BDS 1.1.2.11 Āryāvarta is confined to the doab of the Ganges-Yamuna. BDS 1.1.2.13-15 considers people from beyond this area as of mixed origin, and hence not worthy of emulation by the Aryans. Some sutras recommend expiatory acts for those who have crossed the boundaries of Aryavarta. Baudhayana Srautasutra recommends this for those who have crossed the boundaries of Aryavarta and ventured into far away places.

The Vasistha Dharma Sutra (oldest sutras ca. 500–300 BCE) I.8-9 and 12-13 locates the Āryāvarta to the east of the disappearance of the Sarasvati River in the desert, to the west of the Kālakavana, to the north of the Pariyatra Mountains and the Vindhya Range and to the south of the Himalayas.

Patanjali's  (mid 2nd century BCE) defines Āryāvarta like the Vasistha Dharmasutra. According to Bronkhost, he "situates it essentially in the Ganges plan, between the Thar desert in the west and the confluence of the rivers Ganges (Ganga) and Jumna (Yamuna) in the east."

From sea to sea

The Manusmṛti (dated between 2nd cent. BCE to 3rd cent. CE) (2.22) gives the name to "the tract between the Himalaya and the Vindhya ranges, from the Eastern Sea (Bay of Bengal) to the Western Sea (Arabian Sea)".

The Manava Dharmasastra (ca.150-250 CE) gives aryavarta as stretching from the eastern to the western seas, reflecting the growing sphere of influence of the Brahmanical ideology.

Loss of northwest India
The post-Vedic period of the Second Urbanisation saw a decline of Brahmanism. With the growth of cities, which threatened the income and patronage of the rural Brahmins; the rise of Buddhism; and the Indian campaign of Alexander the Great (327-325 BCE), the rise of the Mauryan Empire (322-185 BCE), and the Saka  invasions and rule of northwestern India (2nd c. BC - 4th c. CE), Brahmanism faced a grave threat to its existence.

The decline of Brahmanism was overcome by providing new services and incorporating the non-Vedic Indo-Aryan religious heritage of the eastern Ganges plain and local religious traditions, giving rise to the Hindu synthesis.

Other regional designations
These texts also identify other parts of the Indian subcontinent with specific designations. The Manusmṛti mentions Brahmavarta as the region between the rivers Saraswati and Drishadwati in north-western India. The text defines the area as the place where the "good" people are born, with "goodness" being dependent on location rather than behaviour. The precise location and size of the region has been the subject of academic uncertainty. Some scholars, such as the archaeologists Bridget and Raymond Allchin, believe the term Brahmavarta to be synonymous with the Aryavarta region.

Madhyadesa extended from the upper reaches of the Ganga and the Yamuna to the confluence of the two rivers at Prayaga, and was the region where, during the time of the Mahajanapadas, the  Kurus and the Panchalas existed. The entire region is considered sacred in the Hindu mythology as gods and heroes mentioned in the two epics, the Ramayana and Mahabharata, lived here.

Rulers
The Gurjara-Pratihara king in the tenth century was titled the Maharajadhiraja of Aryavarta.

See also
Names of India 
Bharata Khanda
Airyanem Vaejah, its Zoroastrian counterpart
History of India

Notes

References

Sources
Printed sources

 
 
 
 
 

 

 

Web-sources

Further reading 
 
 

 
Vedic period
Locations in Hindu mythology
Ancient India
North India